Kašpar is a Czech surname. It may refer to:

 Adolf Kašpar (1877-1934), Czech painter and illustrator
 Jan Kašpar (1883-1927), Czech aviator, designer and engineer
 Jonáš Kašpar, Czech slalom canoeist who has competed since the late 2000s
 Lukáš Kašpar (born 1985), Czech ice hockey player
 Karel Kašpar (1870-1941), Czech Catholic cardinal
 Petr Kašpar (born 1960), Czech retired footballer and current Director General of Slovak football club Slovan Bratislava
 Kašpar Mašek, Czech-Slovenian composer

See also
Kasper (disambiguation) 
Casper (disambiguation)

Czech masculine given names